Bang Saphan is a district (amphoe) in the southern part of Prachuap Khiri Khan province, central Thailand.

History
Bang Saphan dates back to the Ayutthaya Kingdom. In the Thonburi Kingdom, it was named Mueang Kamnoed Nopphakhun. King Nangklao (Rama III) of Rattanakosin established Kamnoed Nopphakhun as a fourth-class city under the Kalahom (defence ministry). King Chulalongkorn (Rama V) downgraded the city to Mueang Kamnoed Nopphakhun District. In 1915 King Vajiravudh (Rama VI) renamed the district by removing the word Mueang off. Later the king changed the name to Bang Saphan.

Geography
Bang Saphan's neighboring districts are Thap Sakae to the north and Bang Saphan Noi to the south. To the west are the Tenasserim Hills and the Tanintharyi Division of Myanmar, to the east the Gulf of Thailand.

Administration
The district is divided into seven sub-districts (tambons), which are further subdivided into 71 villages (mubans). There are three townships (thesaban tambon) areas: Kamnoet Nopphakhun covers parts of tambon Kamnoet Nopphakhun, Ronthong covers parts of tambon Ronthong, and Ban Krut covers parts of tambon Thongchai. There are a further seven tambon administrative organizations (TAO) responsible for the non-municipal areas.

Economy
Locals still work at gold panning  in Klong Thong, a natural stream at Ban Pa Ron in Tambon Ron Thong, and a nearby creek, Huai Janghan. It is claimed that they can make more from panning gold than from farming. 

Ban Huai Kriab is known for black-and-white rattan basketry. Its Ban Huai Kriab Rattan Weaving Group numbers 38 persons who fashion rattan utensils and operate nine shops.

Gallery

References

External links
 Amphoe.com

Bang Saphan